PEMT may refer to:

Phosphatidylethanolamine N-methyltransferase, an enzyme encoded by the PEMT gene which synthesizes phosphatidylcholine
Polymorphic epithelial mucin, a mucin encoded by the MUC1 gene in humans
Post-edited machine translation, whereby humans amend machine-generated translation to achieve an acceptable final product